The Collection of German Prints or SDD is the virtual German national library. Founded in 1989 by an association of six German libraries it covers the entire German-language literature.

Each library is responsible for a specified period of time:

 1450–1600: Bavarian State Library (Munich)
 1601–1700: Herzog August Library (Wolfenbüttel)
 1701–1800: Göttingen State and University Library
 1801–1870: Frankfurt University Library
 1871–1912: Berlin State Library
 since 1913: German National Library

See also 
 German National Library#Working Group for the Collection of German Imprints (AG SDD)

External links 
 Arbeitsgemeinschaft Sammlung Deutscher Drucke (archive)

German digital libraries
German-language literature
National libraries
1989 establishments in Germany
Libraries established in 1989